Estrées-sur-Noye (literally Estrées on Noye) is a commune in the Somme department in Hauts-de-France in northern France.

Geography
The Roman road, the Chaussée Brunehaut ran through the village and gives it its name (Estreti, which means village on the street or more precisely 'village on the road).

It is one of many villages in the north of France bearing the name Estrées. The etymology of the name is from strata (cognate of English "street"), the word for the stone-layered Roman roads in the area (some of which turned into modern highways). Hence Estreti, village on the road which developed into Estrées''.

Population

See also
Communes of the Somme department

References

External links

Communes of Somme (department)